Marcus Trebellius Maximus was a Roman senator active during the reign of Nero. He was suffect consul for the nundinium of May to June 55 AD as the colleague of Seneca the Younger, replacing Publius Cornelius Dolabella.

In 61 Trebellius served on a commission to revise the census list and tax assessments in Gaul, together with Quintus Volusius Saturninus and Titus Sextius Africanus.  Saturninus and Africanus were rivals, and both hated Trebellius, who took advantage of their rivalry to get the better of them. In AD 63, he was appointed governor of Britain. He continued the policy of consolidation followed by his immediate predecessor, and conquered no new territory. He continued the Romanisation of Britain, refounding Camulodunum after the rebellion of Boudica destroyed it. London grew in mercantile wealth under his rule.

By 67, the province was secure enough to allow Legio XIV Gemina to be withdrawn, but inactivity, and the lack of opportunities for booty, led to mutinies among the legions that remained. Not being a military man, Trebellius was unable to restore discipline, and a feud with Marcus Roscius Coelius, commander of XX Valeria Victrix, further undermined his authority.

In 69, the Year of the Four Emperors, Britain did not forward its own candidate to replace Nero as other regions had done. Instead, Roscius led a mutiny which forced Trebellius to flee, and threw his weight behind Vitellius, sending units from Legio XX to fight for him. Once Vitellius had gained the empire he appointed a new governor, Marcus Vettius Bolanus. Vitellius also returned Legio XIV, which had sided with his defeated opponent Otho, to Britain.

References

Roman governors of Britain
Ancient Romans in Britain
Suffect consuls of Imperial Rome
People of the Year of the Four Emperors
Trebellii
1st-century Romans